Morrisville is a town located primarily in Wake County, North Carolina, United States (a small portion extends into neighboring Durham County). The U.S. Census Bureau estimated the town's population to be 31,278 as of July 1, 2021. Morrisville is part of the Research Triangle metropolitan region. The regional name originated after the 1959 creation of the Research Triangle Park, located midway between the cities of Raleigh and Durham. The Research Triangle region encompasses the U.S. Census Bureau's Combined Statistical Area (CSA) of Raleigh-Durham-Cary. The estimated population of the Raleigh-Durham-Cary CSA was 2,144,608 as of 2021, with the Raleigh-Cary Metropolitan Statistical Area (MSA) portion estimated at 1,448,411 residents. The  operational headquarter of an American -Chinese multinational technology company Lenovo is located in the municipal limits.

History
The area was originally named in 1852 after Jeremiah Morris. Morris donated land to the North Carolina Railroad for a depot, water tower, and other buildings. The town continued to grow as a result of the rail line and its location at the intersection of roads leading to Chapel Hill, Raleigh, and Hillsborough.

On April 13, 1865, in the Battle of Morrisville, United States cavalry under the command of Gen. Judson Kilpatrick skirmished with the retreating Confederate armies at Morrisville Station. The Confederate troops were successful in evacuating their remaining supplies and wounded to the west toward Greensboro, but Gen. William Tecumseh Sherman's cavalry forced the Confederates to leave the train behind and retreat toward Durham and the eventual surrender of the largest Confederate force of the war at Bennett Place.

The town was officially chartered in 1875 but was disincorporated in 1933. Eventually the town charter was restored in 1947.

Morrisville History (as listed on historical marker):
Morrisville Station:  "On April 16, 1865, Union cavalry under the command of General William T. Sherman, captured Raleigh and pursued the retreating Confederate cavalry west along the railroad. Rearguard skirmishes erupted at points along the Hillsborough Road until the combatants reached Morrisville.  Using cavalry and artillery, Union forces attacked a Confederate train loaded with supplies and wounded.  Before withdrawing, the Confederate cavalry repelled the attack long enough to allow the railcars of wounded to escape while abandoning the supplies.  This was the last major cavalry engagement in Sherman's campaign.  The next night, a courier from the Confederate commander, General Joseph E. Johnston, rode into the Union camp at Morrisville with a truce proposal.  Subsequent negotiations between Johnston and Sherman led to the largest Confederate surrender of the Civil War at the Bennett Farm in Durham on April 26."

The history marker notes it was given in memory of Commissioner C.T. Moore.

On December 13, 1994, Flagship Airlines Flight 3379 crashed in Morrisville, killing 15 of the 20 people on board.

Geography

Morrisville is located in the northeast central region of North Carolina, where the North American Piedmont and Atlantic Coastal Plain regions meet. This area is known as the "Fall Line" because it marks the elevation inland at which waterfalls begin to appear in creeks and rivers. As a result, most of Morrisville features gently rolling hills that slope eastward toward the state's flat coastal plain. Its central Piedmont location situates the county approximately three hours west of Atlantic Beach by car and four hours east of the Great Smoky Mountains.

The central core of Morrisville is located along the upper portion of Crabtree Creek, which then feeds into Lake Crabtree, located in the southeastern part of the town.

Climate

Morrisville enjoys a moderate subtropical climate, with moderate temperatures in the spring, fall, and winter. Summers are typically hot with high humidity. Winter highs generally range in the low 50s°F (10 to 13 °C) with lows in the low-to-mid 30s°F (-2 to 2 °C), although an occasional 60 °F (15 °C) or warmer winter day is not uncommon. This is canceled out, however, with several days where highs do not get out of the 30s. There are usually one or two substantial snowfalls per winter, occurring mainly in February. Spring and fall days usually reach the low-to-mid 70s°F (low 20s°C), with lows at night in the lower 50s°F (10 to 14 °C). Summer daytime highs often reach the upper 80s to low 90s°F (29 to 35 °C). The rainiest months are July and August.

Demographics

2020 census

As of the 2020 United States census, there were 29,630 people, 9,699 households, and 6,781 families residing in the town.

2015
A special census was conducted in 2015, and the total population reported by the U.S. Census Bureau was 23,699.

2010 census
As of the 2010 census there were 18,576 people, 7,641 households, and 4,752 families residing in the town. The population density was 2,237.7 people per square mile (864.0/km2). There were 8,357 housing units at an average density of 1,006.9 per square mile (390.5/km2). Known as North Carolina's "little India" by locals, Morrisville has become one of the most diverse towns in the state particularly due to the expansion of the technology industry. The racial makeup of the town was 54.0% White, 12.9% African American, 0.4% Native American, 27.2% Asian, 2.0% from some other race, and 3.4% from two or more races. Hispanic or Latino of any race were 5.9% of the population.

There were 7,641 households, out of which 37.1% had children under the age of 18 living with them. 50.3% of all households were headed by married couples living together, 8.9% had a female householder with no husband present, and 37.8% were non-families. 30.0% of all households were made up of individuals, and 2.5% had someone living alone who was 65 years of age or older. The average household size was 2.43, and the average family size was 3.11.

In the town, the population was spread out, with 27.0% under the age of 18, 6.0% from 18 to 24, 44.4% from 25 to 44, 18.4% from 45 to 64, and 4.3% who were 65 years of age or older. The median age was 32.5 years. For every 100 females, there were 96.7 males. For every 100 females age 18 and over, there were 93.2 males.

In 2017, the median income for a household in the town was $95,763. Males had a median income of $59,982 versus $44,729 for females. The per capita income for the town was $43,054. About 3.4% of families and 4.6% of the population were below the poverty line, including 4.1% of those under age 18 and 13.0% of those age 65 or over.

Economy
Morrisville's location adjacent to the Research Triangle Park, Raleigh-Durham International Airport, and Interstate 40 makes it an attractive location for offices, light industry and hotels. Companies based in Morrisville include Oracle , Syneos Health and Lenovo (operational headquarters).

Prior to its disestablishment, Midway Airlines had its headquarters in Morrisville.

The Morrisville Chamber of Commerce serves as the economic development arm for the town.

Employers
The computer technology, clinical trial and telecommunications industries have strong presence in the area.  Major employers in 2019 included:

 Catalent Pharma Solutions
 ChannelAdvisor
 Credit Suisse
 Fujifilm Diosynth Biotechnologies
 Labcorp
 Lenovo
 Metabolon
 NetApp
 Oracle
 PPD, Inc.
 Spectrum
 TrialCard Inc
 UNC Rex Healthcare
 Worldwide Clinical Trials

Arts and culture

National Register of Historic Places
The Morrisville Christian Church, Williamson Page House, and Pugh House are listed on the National Register of Historic Places.

Parks and recreation

Morrisville is home to eight parks, two community centers, four greenways and a fitness center. They include:
 Morrisville Community Park - includes Hatcher Creek greenway in addition to rentable shelters, athletic fields, gazebo and picnic shelters
 Shiloh Community Park & Luther Green Community Center - includes athletic field, picnic shelters, basketball court and playground
 Crabtree Creek Nature Park  -  wooded and wetland site with a multi-purpose field
 Ruritan Park - includes a gazebo, open areas, and sand volleyball courts.
 Indian Creek Greenway and Trailhead - includes two picnic shelters, a playground, restrooms, and a 1.8-mile trail
 Cedar Fork District Park -  that includes eight multi-purpose fields
 Church Street Park - including a cricket pitch and tennis courts.
Northwest Park- open seating and compact playground surrounded by a walking path

Morrisville has several youth sports groups, such as youth basketball, baseball, softball, soccer, and cricket.

Government
Morrisville operates under the Council-Manager form of government. The citizens elect a Mayor and Town Council as the town's governing body. After each municipal election, the Town Council selects a Mayor Pro Tem. The Town Manager, Martha Paige, is appointed by the Council to serve as the chief operating officer administering all municipal affairs. The current Mayor is TJ Cawley and Mayor Pro Tem is Liz Johnson. Morrisville Council members include Steve Rao, Vicki Scroggins-Johnson, Satish Garimella, Anne Robotti, and Donna Fender.

The North Carolina State Board of Dental Examiners has its headquarters in Morrisville.

Infrastructure

Transportation

Passenger

 Air: Raleigh-Durham International Airport is located in northwestern Wake county on I-40, just to the north of Morrisville.
 Morrisville is not served directly by passenger trains. Amtrak serves the nearby municipalities of Cary and Raleigh.
 Local bus: The Triangle Transit operates buses that serve the region and connect to municipal bus systems in Raleigh, Durham and Chapel Hill.

Roads
 is a major highway that goes through town and provides easy access to Cary, Raleigh, Durham and Chapel Hill.
 runs through the eastern part of the town.
 serves the Morrisville area and is located to the west of the town. The highway offers access to I-40, North Raleigh, RDU airport and eastern Wake County.
 is located in the northern part of town and provides easy access to Durham.

Notable people
 David Ray Boggs, former NASCAR driver
 Hill Carrow, sports tourism executive
 Tom Murry, politician, attorney, and pharmacist
 Mabel Pugh (1891–1986), art teacher, painter, woodblock printmaker and illustrator
 Vic Sorrell, former Major League Baseball pitcher

References

External links

 Town of Morrisville official website
 Morrisville Chamber of Commerce

Towns in Durham County, North Carolina
Towns in Wake County, North Carolina
Towns in North Carolina
Populated places established in 1840
1840 establishments in North Carolina